Michel Onfray (born 1 January 1959) is a French writer and philosopher with a hedonistic, epicurean and atheist worldview. A highly-prolific author on philosophy, he has written over 100 books. His philosophy is mainly influenced by such thinkers as Nietzsche, Epicurus, the Cynic and Cyrenaic schools, as well as French materialism. He has gained notoriety for writing such works as Traité d'athéologie: Physique de la métaphysique (translated into English as Atheist Manifesto: The Case Against Christianity, Judaism, and Islam), Politique du rebelle: traité de résistance et d'insoumission, Physiologie de Georges Palante, portrait d'un nietzchéen de gauche, La puissance d'exister and La sculpture de soi for which he won the annual Prix Médicis in 1993.

Onfray is often regarded as being left-wing; however, some observers have stated that he harbours right-wing tendencies. He has become appreciated by some far-right circles, notably with his sovereignist magazine Front populaire.

Life 

Born in Argentan to a family of Norman farmers, Onfray was sent to a weekly Catholic boarding school from ages 10 to 14. This was a solution many parents in France adopted at the time when they lived far from the village school or had working hours that made it too hard or too expensive to transport their children to and from school daily. The young Onfray, however, did not appreciate his new environment, which he describes as a place of suffering. Onfray went on to graduate with a teaching degree in philosophy. He taught this subject to senior students at a high school that concentrates on technical degrees in Caen between 1983 and 2002. At that time, he and his supporters established the Université populaire de Caen, proclaiming its foundation on a free-of-charge basis and on the manifesto written by Onfray in 2004 (La communauté philosophique).

Onfray is an atheist and author of Traité d'Athéologie (Atheist Manifesto), which "became the number one best-selling nonfiction book in France for months when it was published in the Spring of 2005 (the word 'athéologie' Onfray borrowed from Georges Bataille and dedicated to Raoul Vaneigem who had defended freedom of speech, including Holocaust denial, in Nothing is sacred, everything can be said. The book repeated its popular French success in Italy, where it was published in September 2005 and quickly soared to number one on Italy's bestseller lists."

In the 2002 election, Onfray endorsed the French Revolutionary Communist League and its candidate for the French presidency, Olivier Besancenot. In 2007, he endorsed José Bové but eventually voted for Besancenot and conducted an interview with the future French President Nicolas Sarkozy, who, Onfray declared in Philosophie Magazine, was an "ideological enemy".

His book Le crépuscule d'une idole : L'affabulation freudienne (The Twilight of an Idol: The Freudian Confabulation), published in 2010, has been the subject of considerable controversy in France because of its criticism of Sigmund Freud. He recognises Freud as a philosopher but brings attention to the considerable cost of Freud's treatments and casts doubts on the effectiveness of his methods.

In 2015, Onfray published Cosmos, the first book of a trilogy. Onfray considers ironically that it constitutes his "very first book".

Philosophy 
Onfray writes that there is no philosophy without self-psychoanalysis. He describes himself as an atheist and considers theistic religion to be indefensible.

View on history of Western philosophy and philosophical project 
Onfray has published nine books under a project of history of philosophy called Counter-history of Philosophy. In each of these books Onfray deals with a particular historical period in western philosophy. The series of books are composed by the titles I. Les Sagesses Antiques (2006) (on western antiquity), II. Le Christianisme hédoniste (2006) (on Christian hedonism from the Renaissance period), III. Les libertins baroques (2007) (on libertine thought from the Baroque era), IV. Les Ultras des Lumières (2007) (on radical enlightenment thought), V. L'Eudémonisme social (2008) (on radical utilitarian and eudaimonistic thought), VI. Les Radicalités existentielles (2009) (on 19th and 20th century radical existentialist thinkers) and VII. La construction du surhomme: Jean-Marie Guyau, Friedrich Nietzsche (on Guyau's and Nietzsche's philosophy in relation to the concept of the Übermensch). VIII. Les Freudiens hérétiques (2013). IX. Les Consciences réfractaires (2013).

In an interview, Onfray established his view on the history of philosophy:
There is in fact a multitude of ways to practice philosophy, but out of this multitude, the dominant historiography picks one tradition among others and makes it the truth of philosophy: that is to say the idealist, spiritualist lineage compatible with the Judeo-Christian world view. From that point on, anything that crosses this partial – in both senses of the word – view of things finds itself dismissed. This applies to nearly all non-Western philosophies, Oriental wisdom in particular, but also sensualist, empirical, materialist, nominalist, hedonistic currents and everything that can be put under the heading of "anti-Platonic philosophy". Philosophy that comes down from the heavens is the kind that – from Plato to Levinas by way of Kant and Christianity – needs a world behind the scenes to understand, explain and justify this world. The other line of force rises from the earth because it is satisfied with the given world, which is already so much.

"His mission is to rehabilitate materialist and sensualist thinking and use it to re-examine our relationship to the world. Approaching philosophy as a reflection of each individual's personal experience, Onfray inquires into the capabilities of the body and its senses and calls on us to celebrate them through music, painting, and fine cuisine."

Hedonism 

Onfray defines hedonism "as an introspective attitude to life based on taking pleasure yourself and pleasuring others, without harming yourself or anyone else." "Onfray's philosophical project is to define an ethical hedonism, a joyous utilitarianism, and a generalized aesthetic of sensual materialism that explores how to use the brain's and the body's capacities to their fullest extent – while restoring philosophy to a useful role in art, politics, and everyday life and decisions".

Onfray's works "have explored the philosophical resonances and components of (and challenges to) science, painting, gastronomy, sex and sensuality, bioethics, wine, and writing. His most ambitious project is his projected six-volume Counter-history of Philosophy", three of which have been published. Onfray writes:

In opposition to the ascetic ideal advocated by the dominant school of thought, hedonism suggests identifying the highest good with your own pleasure and that of others; the one must never be indulged at the expense of sacrificing the other. Obtaining this balance – my pleasure at the same time as the pleasure of others – presumes that we approach the subject from different angles – political, ethical, aesthetic, erotic, bioethical, pedagogical, historiographical....

His philosophy aims for "micro-revolutions", or "revolutions of the individual and small groups of like-minded people who live by his hedonistic, libertarian values".

Relation to hedonism 
In La puissance d'exister: Manifeste hédoniste, Onfray claims that the political dimension of hedonism runs from Epicurus to John Stuart Mill to Jeremy Bentham and Claude Adrien Helvétius. Political hedonism aims to create the greatest happiness for the greatest numbers.

Alcohol 
In La Raison gourmande, he analyses the relation between philosophers and wine: Gaston Bachelard and Burgundy, Michel Serres and Château d'Yquem. He names also the "alcoholic philosophers": Friedrich Nietzsche, Jean-Paul Sartre, Simone de Beauvoir, Gilles Deleuze, Guy Debord and Raoul Vaneigem, in particular, to whom he dedicated his Traité d'athéologie (2005).

Religion 
The blogger J. M. Cornwell praised Onfray's Atheist Manifesto: The Case Against Christianity, Judaism, and Islam by claiming that it "is a religious and historical time capsule" containing what he sees as "the true deceptions of theological philosophy".

Onfray has been involved in promoting the work of Jean Meslier, an 18th-century French Catholic priest who was discovered, upon his death, to have written a book-length philosophical essay promoting atheism.

In Atheist Manifesto, Onfray states that among the "incalculable number of contradictions and improbabilities in the body of the text of the synoptic Gospels" two claims are made: crucifixion victims were not laid to rest in tombs, and in any case, Jews were not crucified in this period. The historian John Dickson, of Macquarie University, has said that Philo of Alexandria, who wrote about the time of Jesus, noted that the Romans sometimes handed the bodies of crucifixion victims over to family members for proper burial. The Roman Jewish historian Flavius Josephus even remarks: "the Jews are so careful about funeral rites that even malefactors who have been sentenced to crucifixion are taken down and buried before sunset". Regarding the second claim, Dickson calls this a "clear historical blunder".

In Onfray's latest book, Décadence he argued for Christ myth theory, which is a hypotheses that Jesus was not a historical person. Onfray based this on the fact that, other than in the New Testament, Jesus is barely mentioned in accounts of the period.

In July 2021, Onfray criticised Pope Francis's apostolic letter Traditionis custodes by arguing that the Tridentine Mass embodies “the heritage of the genealogical time of our civilization".

Université populaire de Caen 
Onfray was a secondary school philosophy teacher for two decades until he resigned in 2002 to establish a tuition-free Université populaire (People's University) at Caen, at which he and several colleagues teach philosophy and other subjects.

"The Université populaire, which is open to all who cannot access the state university system, and on principle does not accept any money from the State -- Onfray uses the profits from his books to help finance it -- has had enormous success. Based on Onfray's book La Communauté philosophique: Manifeste pour l'Université populaire (2004), the original UP now has imitators in Picardy, Arras, Lyon, Narbonne, and Le Mans, with five more in preparation." "The national public radio network France Culture annually broadcasts his course of lectures to the Université Populaire on philosophical themes."

Reception 
Several authors criticise Onfray for approximations and historical errors contained in several of his works. That is particularly the case of the historians Guillaume Mazeau, Élisabeth Roudinesco, Jean-Marie Salamito with his essay Monsieur Onfray au pays des mythes or even Ian Birchall.

Awards and honors 
Asteroid 289992 Onfray, discovered by astronomers at the Saint-Sulpice Observatory in 2005, was named in Onfray's honour. The official  was published by the Minor Planet Center on 16 March 2014.

Criticism of the Algerian regime 
During a Television interview and as a response to a visit by French president Emmanuel Macron to Algeria in August 2022, Onfray described the ruling regime in Algeria as a "mafia" and asserted that France has no responsibility for the impoverished life of the Algerian people in a country rich in gas and oil because the French had left in 1962. During the interview Onfray said "We know very well that this country has hated us since 1962."

Works

In English

In French
 Le Ventre des philosophes. Critique de la raison diététique, Grasset, 1989
 Cynismes. Portrait du philosophe en chien, Grasset, 1990
 L’Art de jouir. Pour un matérialisme hédoniste, Grasset, 1991
 La Sculpture de soi. La Morale esthétique, Grasset, 1993
 Ars Moriendi. Cent petits tableaux sur les avantages et les inconvénients de la mort, Folle Avoine, 1994
 La Raison gourmande. Philosophie du goût, Grasset, 1995
 Les Formes du temps. Théorie du sauternes, Mollat, 1996
 Théorie du corps amoureux. Pour une érotique solaire, Grasset, 2000
 Antimanuel de philosophie. Leçons socratiques et alternatives, Bréal, 2001
 Physiologie de Georges Palante. Pour un nietzschéisme de gauche, Grasset, 2002
 L’Invention du plaisir. Fragments cyrénaïques, LGF, 2002
 Célébration du génie colérique. Tombeau de Pierre Bourdieu, Galilée, 2002
 Féeries anatomiques. Généalogie du corps faustien, Grasset, 2003
 La Communauté philosophique. Manifeste pour l’Université populaire, Galilée, 2004
 Traité d’athéologie. Physique de la métaphysique, Grasset, 2005
 La Sagesse tragique. Du bon usage de Nietzsche, LGF, 2006
 Suite à La Communauté philosophique. Une machine à porter la voix, Galilée, 2006
 La Puissance d’exister. Manifeste hédoniste, Grasset, 2006
 L’Innocence du devenir. La Vie de Frédéric Nietzsche, Galilée, 2008
 Le Songe d’Eichmann. Précédé de : Un kantien chez les nazis, Galilée, 2008
 Le Souci des plaisirs. Construction d’une érotique solaire, Flammarion, 2008
 La Religion du poignard. Éloge de Charlotte Corday, Galilée, 2009
 Le Crépuscule d'une idole. L’Affabulation freudienne, Grasset, 2010
 Apostille au Crépuscule. Pour une psychanalyse non freudienne, Grasset, 2010
 Manifeste hédoniste, Autrement, 2011
 L'Ordre libertaire. La Vie philosophique d’Albert Camus, Flammarion, 2012
 Vies et mort d’un dandy. Construction d’un mythe, Galilée, 2012
 Rendre la raison populaire. Université populaire, mode d’emploi, Autrement, 2012
 Le Canari du nazi. Essais sur la monstruosité, Collectif, Autrement, 2013
 La Raison des sortilèges. Entretiens sur la musique, Autrement, 2013
 Bestiaire nietzschéen. Les Animaux philosophiques, Galilée, 2014
 Haute école. Brève histoire du cheval philosophique, Flammarion, 2015
 Penser l'Islam, Grasset, 2016
 La Force du sexe faible. Contre-histoire de la Révolution française, Autrement, 2016
 Tocqueville et les Apaches, Autrement, 2017
 Vivre une vie philosophique. Thoreau le sauvage, Le Passeur, 2017
 Miroir du nihilisme. Houellebecq éducateur, Galilée, 2017
 Solstice d'hiver : Alain, les Juifs, Hitler et l'Occupation, L'Observatoire, 2018
 Le Deuil de la mélancolie, Robert Laffont 2018
 Brève encyclopédie du monde
 Cosmos. Une ontologie matérialiste, Flammarion, 2015
 Décadence. Vie et mort du judéo-christianisme, Flammarion, 2017
 Sagesse, Savoir vivre au pied d'un volcan, Albin Michel 2019
 Contre-histoire de la littérature
 Le réel n'a pas eu lieu. Le Principe de Don Quichotte, Autrement, 2014
 La Passion de la méchanceté. Sur un prétendu divin marquis, Autrement, 2014
 Contre-histoire de la philosophie
 Les Sagesses antiques, Grasset, 2006
 Le Christianisme hédoniste, Grasset, 2006
 Les Libertins baroques, Grasset, 2007
 Les Ultras des Lumières, Grasset, 2007
 L’Eudémonisme social, Grasset, 2008
 Les Radicalités existentielles, Grasset, 2009
 La Construction du surhomme, Grasset, 2011
 Les Freudiens hérétiques, Grasset, 2013
 Les Consciences réfractaires, Grasset, 2013
 La Pensée postnazie, Grasset, 2018
 L'Autre pensée 68, Grasset, 2018
 Esthetic
 L’Œil nomade. La Peinture de Jacques Pasquier, Folle Avoine, 1993
 Métaphysique des ruines. La Peinture de Monsù Desiderio, Mollat, 1995
 Splendeur de la catastrophe. La Peinture de Vladimir Vélikovic, Galilée, 2002
 Les Icônes païennes. Variations sur Ernest Pignon-Ernest, Galilée, 2003
 Archéologie du présent. Manifeste pour une esthétique cynique, Adam Biro/Grasset, 2003
 Épiphanies de la séparation. La Peinture de Gilles Aillaud, Galilée, 2004
 Oxymoriques. Les Photographies de Bettina Rheims, Jannink, 2005
 Fixer des vertiges : Les Photographies de Willy Ronis, Galilée, 2007
 Le Chiffre de la peinture. L’Œuvre de Valerio Adami, Galilée, 2008
 La Vitesse des simulacres. Les Sculptures de Pollès, Galilée, 2008
 L'Apiculteur et les Indiens. La Peinture de Gérard Garouste, Galilée, 2009
 Transe est connaissance. Un chamane nommé Combas, Flammarion, 2014
 La danse des simulacres, Robert Laffon, 2019
 Political views
 Politique du rebelle. Traité de résistance et d’insoumission, Grasset, 1997
 La Pensée de midi. Archéologie d’une gauche libertaire, Galilée, 2007
 Le Postanarchisme expliqué à ma grand-mère. Le Principe de Gulliver, Galilée, 2012
 Le Miroir aux alouettes. Principes d'athéisme social, Plon, 2016
 Décoloniser les provinces. Contribution aux présidentielles, L'Observatoire, 2017
 La Cour des Miracles. Carnets de campagne, L'Observatoire, 2017
 Zéro de conduite. Carnet d'après-campagne, L'Observatoire, 2018
 Théorie de la dictature, Robert Laffon, 2019
 Vies parallèles : De Gaulle - Mitterrand, Robert Laffon, 2020
 Hedonist diaries
 Le Désir d’être un volcan, Grasset, 1996
 Les Vertus de la foudre, Grasset, 1998
 L’Archipel des comètes, Grasset, 2001
 La Lueur des orages désirés, Grasset, 2007
 Le Magnétisme des solstices, Flammarion, 2013
 Le Temps de l'étoile polaire, Robert Laffont, 2019
 The fierce philosophy
 Exercices anarchistes, Galilée, 2004
 Traces de feux furieux, Galilée, 2006
 Philosopher comme un chien, Galilée, 2010
 Travelogue
 À côté du désir d’éternité. Fragments d’Égypte, Mollat, 1998
 Esthétique du pôle Nord. Stèles hyperboréennes, Grasset, 2002
 Théorie du voyage. Poétique de la géographie, LGF, 2007
 Les Bûchers de Bénarès. Cosmos, Éros et Thanatos, Galilée, 2008
 Nager avec les piranhas. Carnet guyanais, Gallimard, 2017
 Le Désir ultramarin. Les Marquises après les Marquises, Gallimard, 2017
 Tetralogy of elements
 Le Recours aux forêts. La Tentation de Démocrite, Galilée, 2009
 La Sagesse des abeilles. Première leçon de Démocrite, Galilée, 2012
 La Constellation de la baleine. Le Songe de Démocrite, Galilée, 2013
 La Cavalière de Pégase. Dernière leçon de Démocrite, Galilée, 2019
 Poetry
 Un requiem athée, Galilée, 2013
 Avant le silence. Haïkus d’une année, Galilée, 2014
 Les Petits serpents. Avant le silence, II, Galilée, 2015
 L'Éclipse de l'éclipse. Avant le silence, III, Galilée, 2016

References

Further reading 

 In Bosnian
 Onfre u Podgorici: Ciklus predavanja, Centar za građansko obrazovanje, 2013 (Filip Kovacevic)
 In French
 Dieu avec esprit : réponse à Michel Onfray, P. Rey, 2005 (Irène Fernandez)
 L'anti traité d'athéologie : le système Onfray mis à nu, Presses de la Renaissance, 2005 (Matthieu Baumier)
 Michel Onfray, la force majeure de l'athéisme, Pleins Feux, 2006 (Alain Jugnon)
 Le dieu caché : Michel Onfray éclairé par Blaise Pascal, le Cep, 2006 (Philippe Lauria)
 Des-montages : le poujadisme hédoniste de Michel Onfray, I & D Vingt-scènes, 2006 (Harold Bernat)
 Anti-Onfray 1 : sur Freud et la psychanalyse, L'Harmattan, 2010 (Emile Jalley)
 Anti-Onfray 2 : les réactions au livre de Michel Onfray : débat central, presse, psychanalyse théorique, L'Harmattan, 2010 (Emile Jalley)
 Anti-Onfray 3 : Les réactions au livre de Michel Onfray Clinique, psychopathologie, philosophie, lettres, histoire, sciences sociales, politique, réactions de l'étranger, le décret scélérat sur la psychothérapie, L'Harmattan, 2010 (Emile Jalley)
 Mais pourquoi tant de haine ?, Seuil, 2010 (Élisabeth Roudinesco)
 Un crépuscule pour Onfray : minutes de l'interrogatoire du contempteur de Freud, L'Harmattan, 2011 (Guy Laval)
 L'évangile de Michel Onfray ! : ou Comment Onfray peur inspirer les plus ou moins chrétiens ainsi que tous les autres, Golias, 2011 (Thierry Jaillet)
 La Gageure, autopsie du traité d'athéologie de monsieur Onfray, Les Éditions du Net, 2012 (Abdellah Erramdani)
 Antichrists et philosophes : en défense de Michel Onfray, Obsidiane, 2012 (Alain Jugnon)
 Michel Onfray, le principe d'incandescence, Grasset, 2013 (Martine Torrens Frandji)
 Michel Onfray : une imposture intellectuelle, les Ed. de l'Epervier, 2013 (Michael Paraire)
 Onfray coi maintenant ? : quelques réflexions (tardives) sur et autour du livre Crépuscule d'une idole : affabulations freudiennes, L'Harmattan, 2014 (Michel Santacroce)
 La contre-histoire de Michel Onfray, Tatamis, 2014 (Jonathan Sturel)
 L'anti traité d'athéologie: le système onfray mis à nu, Presses de la Renaissance, 2014 (Matthieu Baumier)
 Réponse à Michel Onfray : et autres textes sur la Résistance, Delga, 2015 (Léon Landini)
 Michel Onfray ou L'intuition du monde, Le Passeur éditeur, 2016 (Adeline Baldacchino)
 Contre Onfray, Nouvelles éditions Lignes, 2016 (Alain Jugnon)
 Monsieur Onfray au pays des mythes : réponses sur Jésus et le christianisme, Salvator, 2017 (Jean-Marie Salamito)
 Michel Onfray, la raison du vide, Pierre-Guillaume de Roux, 2017 (Rémi Lélian)
 Michel Onfray... le vin mauvais ?, Tonnerre de l'Est éditions, 2017 (Thierry Weber, Olivier Humbrecht)
 En finir avec Onfray : du déni de Bataille à la boboïsation ambiante, Champ Vallon, 2018 (Gilles Mayné)

External links

  
Blog about Onfray  
Profile of Michel Onfray in New Humanist magazine, July/August 2007

1959 births
20th-century atheists
20th-century French essayists
20th-century French male writers
20th-century French non-fiction writers
20th-century French philosophers
20th-century French poets
20th-century travel writers
21st-century atheists
21st-century French essayists
21st-century French male writers
21st-century French non-fiction writers
21st-century French philosophers
21st-century French poets
21st-century travel writers
Anti-consumerists
Anti-natalists
Atheist philosophers
Christ myth theory proponents
Consequentialists
Contemporary philosophers
Continental philosophers
Critics of Christianity
Critics of Islam
Critics of Judaism
Critics of religions
Critics of the Catholic Church
French anti-capitalists
French atheism activists
French atheists
French ethicists
French historians of philosophy
French libertarians
French male essayists
French male non-fiction writers
French male poets
French materialists
French people of Norman descent
French philosophers
French political philosophers
French social commentators
French socialists
French travel writers
Hedonism
Libertarian socialists
Literacy and society theorists
Living people
New Atheism
People from Argentan
Philosophers of art
Philosophers of culture
Philosophers of economics
Philosophers of history
Philosophers of love
Philosophers of mind
Philosophers of religion
Philosophers of sexuality
Philosophers of social science
Philosophy writers
Prix Médicis essai winners
Social philosophers
Theorists on Western civilization
Utilitarians
Writers about activism and social change
Writers about religion and science